Scott "Dynamite" Dann (born 23 July 1974) is a British former professional boxer who competed from 1997 to 2006. He held the British middleweight title from 2004 to 2005 and the Commonwealth middleweight title in 2006. As an amateur, he won the 1996 ABA Championships in the light middleweight division.

Scott Dann was born on 23 July 1974 in Plymouth, England. As a professional he won the English, British, Commonwealth, and IBO Inter-Continental middleweight titles, and challenged Howard Eastman for the British, Commonwealth and EBU European middleweight titles in 2003, losing via third round technical knockout (TKO).

References

External links

Image - Scott Dann

1974 births
English male boxers
Light-heavyweight boxers
Light-middleweight boxers
Living people
Middleweight boxers
Sportspeople from Plymouth, Devon
Super-middleweight boxers